Church renewal is a term widely used by church leaders to express hope for revitalization of the Church (as well as Christianity in general) in light of the decline of Christianity in many western countries. The idea of a post-Christian era has made church renewal a popular topic of study among many commentators. Various philosophical, theological, sociological, and practical reasons have been given for the decline of Christianity and the waning influence of the church, and various ideas have been proposed to halt the decline. This has led to the rise of a number of church renewal movements, such as the emerging church movement, the missional church movement, the confessing movement, the simple church movement, New Calvinism, and New Monasticism,  among others.

History
While the church has experienced trials throughout church history, the modern church renewal movements have arisen in response to the decline of the church in recent history. For example, between 1948 and 2008 the percentage of Americans who identified themselves with some form of Christianity has dropped from 91% to 77%. Even more troubling for church leaders is that of the 59% of Americans who are not affiliated with a church, six out of ten still consider themselves Christians and do not feel a need to be associated with a church congregation.

Cognate terms 
Other phrases that may be synonymous with church renewal include congregational transformation, congregational renewal, revitalization, and restoration.  An older term that tends to focus on the renewal of spiritual or sacramental vitality is revival.  While some advocates for church renewal spend a great deal of time discussing etymological differences between these terms, the terms are highly similar at the conceptual level.  Alternatively, they use these terms because they believe the church is in decline or decay in one way or another and that action must be taken so that the church will flourish once again.

Church renewal and Christianity in the modern West 
Theologians and other scholars often deploy the concept of church renewal in close connection with a wider concern about the state of Christianity in the modern West.  Generally speaking, there is widespread concern that Christianity in the modern West is in serious trouble.  Among other factors, low church attendance in Western Europe and the decline of mainline Protestantism in North America often motivate this concern.  In both Western Europe and North America, a wide range of church renewal movements have sprung up with the primary objective of determining the causes of the decline of Christianity in the modern West and to develop strategies for reversing that trend.  For example, dozens of renewal movements have emerged within mainline Protestant denominations in the United States.

Church renewal and Christianity in the Global South 
Many theologians and scholars of religion have begun to look to Christianity in the Global South for hints and suggestions concerning the renewal of the church in the modern West.  There is a growing awareness that Christianity is flourishing in many countries in the Southern Hemisphere.  Thus clergy and scholars alike are increasingly looking to churches in places like Africa and South America for advice about the renewal of Christianity in the Northern hemisphere, most notably in the North Atlantic.

Church renewal and Pentecostalism 
While many clergy and scholars are turning to the Global South for assistance and ideas, some clergy and scholars have begun to take seriously the worldwide Pentecostal movement.  At this stage, it is difficult to determine the extent to which leaders of mainline Protestant churches are prepared to turn to the Pentecostal and Charismatic movements for help.  By contrast, the charismatic movement has already possibly made significant inroads within the Roman Catholic Church.

Notable theologians dealing with church renewal
Alan Hirsch
Thomas C. Oden
Michael Frost
Ed Stetzer
Brian McLaren
William Abraham
Harvey Cox

References

External links
Association for Church Renewal
The Institute on Religion & Democracy
Practical theology
Christian terminology